Kosthapal Punyasoma is a 2014 Sri Lankan Sinhala romantic thriller film directed by Udayakantha Warnasuriya and co-produced by Yohan Premaratne and Sunil T. Fernando for Bahuru Films and Sunil T. Films. It stars Mahendra Perera, Duleeka Marapana, and Srinath Maddumage in lead roles along with Gamini Hettiarachchi and Sriyantha Mendis. Music composed by Mahesh Denipitiya. It is the 1206th Sri Lankan film in the Sinhala cinema.

The film has been shot in Colombo and its suburbs. The film passed successful 50 days, earning 600 Lakhs of Sri Lankan rupees.

Plot
A police officer called Kosthapal Punyasoma is the main character of this film. He tries to catch thieves but is not successful. One day, a thief called Anton and his friends kidnap a bride.

Cast
 Mahendra Perera as Kosthapal Punyasoma
 Sriyantha Mendis as OIC Panditharathna
 Gamini Hettiarachchi as Sargent Wickrampala
 Duleeka Marapana as Champa
 Ronnie Leitch as Businessman
 Ananda Athukorala as Shanika's groom
 Srinath Maddumage as Anton
 Menik Wijewardena as Shanika
 Viraj Jayasiri as Prashan
 Ravindra Yasas as Anton's henchman
 Lahiru Mudalige as Prashan's friend
 Nilmini Kottegoda as Sargent's wife
 Chathura Perera as Bus thief
 D.B. Gangodathenna as Bus thief victim

Soundtrack

References

External links
පුඤ්ඤසෝම නවත්වන්න උත්සාහයක් තිබුණා

2014 films
2010s Sinhala-language films
Films directed by Udayakantha Warnasuriya